Star of Oregon may refer to:

Star of Oregon (event), commercial enterprise that brought cattle to the U.S. state of Oregon 1840–1843
Star of Oregon (ship), American vessel built in 1840–1842
SS Star of Oregon, American Liberty Ship launched in 1941